Lébény ( or ) is a town in Győr-Moson-Sopron County, midway between Mosonmagyaróvár and Győr, Hungary. It has a Romanesque monastic church commenced in 1208. Similar family or clan-financed medieval Hungarian monastic churches can be found in Ják, Ócsa, Nyírbátor, Harina and Mălâncrav.

Early history
The Lébény area has been occupied continuously since prehistoric times. Signs of human occupation have been found from the Neolithic, through the Bronze and Iron Ages, including excavated remains of Celtic habitation. When Tiberius, later the Roman Emperor, overran Transdanubia in AD 9, he established a military camp and civilian settlement in the area of present-day Lébény.

In later centuries the region was inhabited by Huns, then by Lombards, and then by Avars, who were converted to Christianity. Excavations have confirmed there was already a sizeable community at Lébény at the time of the Hungarian Conquest of the Carpathian Basin in the 9th and 10th centuries, including Slavic groups.

The first written mention of the place was under the name Libin in 1208.

Romanesque church
Now the parish church of St James the Apostle, this Romanesque church was originally built for a community of Benedictine monks. Its nave with two aisles and three apses forms a basilica structure. The capitals of the columns inside the church are carved with plant ornamentation.

Further detail
Photograph of the church with an extended historical caption: Retrieved 31 August 2017.
Gerő László (1984): Magyar műemléki ABC (ABC of Hungarian Historical Monuments). In Hungarian
Gervers-Molnár Vera (1972): A középkori Magyarország rotundái (Rotundas of Medieval Hungary). In Hungarian
Henszlmann Imre (1876): Magyarország ó-keresztyén, román és átmeneti stylü mű-emlékeinek rövid ismertetése (Short Survey of Hungary's Early Christian, Romanesque, and Transitional Style Historic Monuments). In Hungarian

References

External links

  in Hungarian and German

Populated places in Győr-Moson-Sopron County
Romanesque architecture in Hungary